Sanjoy Ghose (7 December 1959 – 4 July 1997) was an Indian rural development activist known for his pioneering contributions to community health and development media. He is believed to have been killed by United Liberation Front of Asom (ULFA) militants in the river island of Majuli on the Brahmaputra river around 4 July 1997.

Biography

Early life
Born in Nagpur, Ghose spent his formative years and his adolescence in Mumbai, Maharashtra. He belonged to a well known Bengali family.
Bhaskar Ghose, erstwhile Director General of Doordarshan, the Indian public television network, is his uncle. His aunts are Ruma Pal a former Supreme Court judge, Arundhati Ghose, former diplomat and India's permanent representative to the United Nations during the 1990s, and the journalist Usha Rai. His mother, Vijaya Ghose, is the editor of the Limca Book of records
He was educated at the Cathedral and John Connon School.
He was the president of his school wing of the Interact club: which is the Rotary International sponsored service club for young people aged 12 to 18.His experiences of social work, as a school boy, through the Interact club, changed his life priorities, and set the course for his life.

His father recalls, "As a school going boy he spent two nights in a Bombay (presently Mumbai) slum in torrential rain just to get a feel of the real problems that plague slums."

After school, he was educated at a liberal arts college, Elphinstone College located in Mumbai. Apart from graduating in rural development and law with college and university honours, he also edited the college magazine, ran the English literature club, and won University of Mumbai competitions for quizzing and debating. He was also active in the National Service Scheme – taking his fellow students to remote tribal villages in the hilly tracts abutting the Western Ghats in Thane district- to experience first hand the poverty and exploitation of the tribal communities.

In 1980, he chose to join the then unknown Institute of Rural Management, Anand (IRMA) in its very first batch. He had confirmed admissions to all the three then existing IIMs, ( Indian Institute of Management )  – Ahmedabad, Bangalore and Calcutta. Joining the prestigious IIM opened the way to very well paying corporate careers. He chose the then unknown IRMA over the known IIMs, in keeping with his personal commitment to work for the poorest of the poor.

Dr.Srikanth Sambrani, the first director of IRMA, remembered the selection interview, in an Indian Express article, dated 12 August 1997, thus –
"I first met him in 1980, when conducting admissions interviews for the Institute of Rural Management at Anand. We were highly impressed by his paper qualifications. He walked into our small room, all 5 ft 5 in of him held like the fearless bantam he undoubtedly was. But since he had applied to IIM Ahmedabad also, we thought we would lose him. We spent an hour discussing the relative merits of IIMA and IRMA. When he turned down IIMA, it was a coup for us."

Career
After his post graduation with very good grades from IRMA, in 1982, he chose to work in a small rural development trust, Tribhuvandas Foundation, in Anand, Kheda district, over much more visible and better paying jobs with Government sponsored milk cooperative federations. In Tribhuvandas Foundation, he catalysed its growth from a small family run trust, to working in hundred odd villages, hiring professional rural medical doctors, and extension staff.

After two years with Tribhuvandas foundation, he won the INLAKs foundation scholarship for a MSc degree in economics from St Anne's College, Oxford in 1984. After Oxford, he decided to return to rural India. He set up the URMUL Rural Health and Development Trust — in the desert district of Bikaner in Rajasthan.(1986). While working with URMUL, he won the Hubert Humphrey fellowship — and spent a year with the prestigious Johns Hopkins Bloomberg School of Public Health in the year 1988–89. Working with the sick of the poorest of the poor, told on his personal health. He contracted tuberculosis, while collecting sputum for testing, from potential TB patients. After establishing URMUL Rural Health and Development Trust as a mainstream NGO in Rajasthan, he handed over the organisation to a successor, and shifted to Delhi. This was an unprecedented decision for Indian voluntary agencies — as the founders usually hang on to their leadership position till they die.

Sanjoy Ghose wrote extensively about his grassroot experiences with the URMUL Trust in Lunkaransar Village in Bikaner.
The Indian Express, a leading national daily, used his writings to launch a successful monthly column named 'Village Voice'. The "action experiment"  of tapping the power of the mainstream middle class urban English media to reflect unheard rural voices spoken in local languages, grounded in very local realities, got a measure of success.

Recognizing the potential of writing in mainstream media to highlight rural development issues and catalyse change, Sanjoy conceived of CHARKHA. CHARKHA appears to have been initiated to exploit the legitimate opportunities available in the national media for influencing policies related to rural development. It also addressed the concern that such a massive task, required more support than his single voice. His discussions with senior media persons from the national dailies seemed to suggest that an organisation dedicated to development communication could work. CHARKHA in a sense was an attempt to  "institutionalize"  the success of the "Village voice" experience — and broaden the scope to bring in more writing talent and different geographies. On 24 October 1994, CHARKHA was formally initiated in New Delhi- with the goal of spinning action into words.Its formal vision is "To contribute towards building a harmonious, inclusive society empowered by knowledge."

Sanjoy appeared to have been a firm believer in the philosophy of Reflective practice. He wrote and published extensively, analytic pieces on rural development- which would have incorporated insights from his own personal experiences as a catalyst for rural change
. The World Bank had also published one such paper.

After launching CHARKHA, he decided to work in the insurgent prone Upper Assam, specifically in Majuli island on the Brahmaputra. His father recollected the family discussions around this decision.  " When we were dissuading Sanjoy from going to the terrorism-ridden Assam", he replied, "then whose son will you send ?"

Through the sponsorship of Association of Voluntary Agencies for Rurul Development, North East (AVARD-NE) Sanjoy and seven colleagues set up base in Majuli island on the Brahmaputra river in April 1996. The island faced annual flooding and erosion of land. The island had shrunk by around 500 square kilometres in the last twenty years. Around February 1997, he and his team mobilised around 30,000 human days of voluntary labour (shram dhan). An experimental stretch of 1.7 kilometres of land was protected from erosion, by building embankments: using only local resources and their knowledge. The following year this protected stretch of the island survived the floods.
Sanjoy, in this short time, had also diversified the social activities in Majuli: around health (malaria prevention),livelihoods (design, and manufacturing of bamboo and woven products), and education (village libraries).

It appears that by doing so, Sanjoy and his group had displeased a powerful local Government works contractor lobby: which also provided patronage to the United Liberation Front of Assam (ULFA). When posters were put up by presumably this contractor lobby, which would have lost its annual lucrative contracts for "flood protection":   many locals participated in a public meeting on 1 June 1997, to express solidarity with the constructive work done. The local police offered Sanjoy protection, in view of the public threats issued by ULFA. Sanjoy however refused this, in tune with his personal beliefs that "local people are my best protection". ULFA abducted Sanjoy on 4 July 1997.

Some of Sanjoy's written work, was put together and was released as a book by Penguin Books in 1998: titled "Sanjoy's Assam: diaries and writings of Sanjoy Ghose"

Death 
A newspaper article in the Deccan Herald on 9 February 2009 claimed that "(Ghose) had been killed a day after he was abducted by ULFA cadres on July four, 1997, and his body, which was never found, was thrown into the swirling waters of the Brahmaputra. The killing,... was carried out by local cadre even before the top leadership could convey to them the message not to harm him to avoid possible international repercussions." Confirming that the death was at the hands of local ULFA terrorists,the ULFA leader, Paresh Baruah stated in an interview that "there was no instruction to kill Sanjoy Ghosh".
The Central Bureau of Investigation, which had been entrusted with the investigations, of the murder of Sanjoy Ghose, had filed chargesheets against 11 ULFA militants.

The local ULFA leader, Amrit Datta, who was accused of masterminding the kidnap and murder of Sanjoy Ghose was killed in a joint operation by the Central Reserve Police Force, and the local police in a shootout in the evening of 19 July 2008 in Majuli.

Arabinda Rajkhowa, the Chairman of ULFA, publicly apologised at Majuli for the killing of Sanjoy Ghose, as per news reports of June 2011. His widow, Mrs. Schumita Ghose, responded, "Only the Almighty has the power to forgive. I am just a human being and I want justice to be done."

Legacy

An international appeal for his release carried by the leftist magazine Economic and Political Weekly, summarised his work in Rajasthan and in media advocacy thus;
"From 1986 to 1995 Sanjoy did pioneering work in western Rajasthan. He set up URMUL Trust in 1986 in Bikaner with the chief objective of empowering the local people to address their own development needs. By 1995, URMUL expanded into a network of organisations addressing the concerns of the poor in the districts of Bikaner, Jodhpur and Jaisalmer in western Rajasthan. Sanjoy wrote extensively and spiritedly on development issues. He was one of the firsts to realise the need for media advocacy for the NGOs and struggle-based groups, and established CHARKHA as an interface between NGOs and the mainstream media."
.

A couple of decades, after his untimely demise, both his creations, URMUL Trust and CHARKHA continue to survive and grow in the "rural development sector"   – URMUL and its affiliates in the desert districts of Rajasthan, and CHARKHA in the world of development media.

The Ashoka: Innovators for the Public had instituted the Sanjoy Ghose Endowment in his memory in 1998 for "building a culture of volunteerism and a sense of citizen responsibility among the youth in India's northeastern state of Assam"
The Sanjoy Ghose Memorial Trust Society was formed in the year 2000, in Majuli. The Trust has been holding memorial services every year on 4 July, the day of his disappearance and suspected death.
The Trust announced plans to launch an audio-video project on school documentation in Majuli on Ghose's 15th memorial day on 4 July 2011:in a bid to carry on the social worker's legacy.

A fictionalised biography on Sanjoy Ghose, written in the Assamese was published in 2008.

A website in his memory was launched on the fifteenth "smriti divas" (remembrance day) on 4 July 2011 by this trust.

His book, Sanjoy's Assam, has been used by the 2011 Indian anti-corruption movement, to initiate the anti corruption movement in Assam.

A bilingual film inspired by his life was made in Assamese and Hindi, which was directed by Bidyut Kotoky and produced by the National Film Development Corporation of India. The film was shot in Majuli and Mumbai. The Assamese version, titled Ekhon Nedekha Nodir Xhipare, was released on 14 September 2012. The film won two awards for the Best Script and Best Actor at the second edition of the Washington DC South Asian Film Festival.
The film won the Audience Choice Award at the North Carolina International South Asian Film Festival (NCISAFF) for 2014.
The Hindi version, titled As the River Flows, is yet to release.

In 2016 and 2017, students of the Institute of Rural Management Anand, have celebrated his birthday, (7 December) as "Joy Day': by organising a blood donation drive, and hosting a function to remember him in their campus.

In 37 years Sanjoy Ghose had packed more into life than most people do in a hundred years or more. An article in the prominent political magazine Tehelka, described Sanjoy as "The man who saw tomorrow". It ran a feature on him with the title "Sanjoy Ghose was a dogged catalyst of change. And he paid the ultimate price for it".
RN Haldipur, (former director of IRMA),who served on the Board of Tribhuvandas Foundation, when Sanjoy was working there, assessed him thus "Sanjoy was a positive and tenacious votary who functioned with single-minded purpose. Instead of joining the corporate sector, he took the hard path, full of difficulties and austerity. To him work was soul-satisfying worship. Transparent in his dealings, he was a man of great integrity."

CHARKHA

CHARKHA has instituted the "Sanjoy Ghose Media Fellowships" in his memory. This has been awarded since 2003 in the state of Jammu and Kashmir, to encourage writers, particularly women, to generate research based writings that reflect their unique perspective on the concerns of their people in a region that has known conflicts for several decades now.

In 2011, the award was targeted to women writers from the underdeveloped mountain region of Ladakh. In 2015, the award had been renamed Sanjoy Ghose Rural Reporting Awards (Ladakh) 2015

A review of Charkha in 2017, stated that "Charkha has since upheld this vision articulated in its mandate "To contribute towards building a harmonious, inclusive society empowered by knowledge".Over the last more than two decades Charkha has translated this into an expansive engagement with rural marginalised communities across several regions in the country.Through its #Tri-lingual Feature Service in Hindi, English and Urdu the organisation continues to place their perspectives as articles in the media across the three languages. Charkha is making all attempts to live up to a phrase coined at the time of its founding " Spinning Action into Words"!"

Education and career

 Schooled in Cathedral and John Connon School, Mumbai
 Graduate from Elphinstone College, Mumbai, with specialisation in Rural Development and Law, 1977 -1980.
 Post graduate degree in Rural Management from IRMA Institute of Rural Management in Anand, Gujarat, 1980–1982.
 MSc in Agricultural Economics from St Anne's College, Oxford, United Kingdom with an Inlaks Scholarship.1984–85
 Masters in Public Health, Johns Hopkins University, USA as a Hubert Humphrey Fellow.1988–89
 Founder Secretary and Trustee, Urmul Rural Health Research & Development Trust, Rajasthan1986
 Founder general secretary, Charkha, the Development Communications Network, New Delhi1994
 Winner of the 1993 Sanskriti Award
 general secretary, Association of Voluntary Agencies in Rural Development (AVARD), New Delhi
 Team leader, AVARD North East

His mission in his own words "To change the world and make a difference in the lives of ordinary people".

Awards
Awarded All India Human Rights Association Manav Shri Puraskar award in the field of Journalism & Social Welfare, 1997–98.

Awarded Karmaveer Puraskaar posthumously for Lifelong Fight For Social Justice Through Citizen Action. 2011

References

External links
 Official website of Charka
 Official website of Urmul

Activists from Maharashtra
1959 births
1997 deaths
Elphinstone College alumni
Alumni of St Anne's College, Oxford
Bengali activists
People in public health
Johns Hopkins Bloomberg School of Public Health alumni
Cathedral and John Connon School alumni
Johns Hopkins Bloomberg School of Public Health